The Liberty League is a high school athletic conference in Los Angeles County, California affiliated with the CIF Southern Section.

Schools
As of 2013, the schools in the league are:
Archer School for Girls
Buckley School
Glendale Adventist Academy	
Holy Martyrs Armenian School
Milken Community High School
New Community Jewish High School
Oakwood School
Pacifica Christian School
Providence High School
Yeshiva University of Los Angeles High School

References

CIF Southern Section leagues